Syllepte secreta is a moth in the family Crambidae. It was described by Edward Meyrick in 1936. It is found in the Democratic Republic of the Congo.

References

Endemic fauna of the Democratic Republic of the Congo
Moths of Africa
Moths described in 1936
secreta
Taxa named by Edward Meyrick